The consequential mood (abbreviated , less often  or ) is a verb form used in some Eskaleut languages to mark dependent adverbial clauses for reason ('because') or time ('when'). Due to the broader meaning of the term mood in the context of Eskimo grammar, the consequential can be considered outside of the proper scope of grammatical mood.

In Central Alaskan Yup'ik, the consequential expresses the meaning 'because':

In Central Siberian Yupik the two forms of the consequential mood are used only for the meanings 'when' and 'while', whereas 'because' is expressed by a particle added to the indicative. Similarly, the consequential expresses the meaning of 'when' in North Alaskan Iñupiaq.

The consequential suffix -nga- is a descendant of the Proto-Eskimoan derivational suffix -nga-, whose meaning is 'having Ved', 'having been Ved'.

References

Bibliography
 
 
 
 
 

Eskaleut languages
Grammatical moods
Inupiat language
Yupik languages